Holy Cross Church in Kopice, Poland, is a Neoclassicist church built between 1802 and 1822.  

A Neoclassicist, single-nave gable roofed church. The main entrance is characterised by a column portal, decorated with a tri-point tympanum. The elevations are plasterworked and in some parts bossaged.

References

Brzeg County
Kopice